The Merrill carbine was a breechloader firearm designed by Baltimore, Maryland gunsmith and inventor James H. Merrill. It was one of several firearms either manufactured or altered by Merrill in fulfillment of contracts with the Union government during the U.S. Civil War.

Overview
The carbine was a single-shot, percussion, breechloader used mainly by Union cavalry units. It used the .54 caliber Minie balls with paper cartridges which were loaded by lifting the top of the breech lever. The barrels were 22 1/8 inches and round with one barrel band.

Known regiments where the carbines were issued are:
New York 1st, 5th, and 18th
Pennsylvania 11th, 17th, and 18th
New Jersey 1st
Indiana 7th
Wisconsin 1st and 3rd
Kentucky 27th
Delaware 1st

Models
The carbines were produced in two versions: First Type and Second Type. The First Type included a brass patch box in the stock and had the breech lever secured by a flat, knurled latch. The Second Type was produced without the patch box and had the breech lever secured with a rounded, button type latch.

Other production
James H. Merrill produced or altered several other firearms which include: the Jenks-Merrill carbine; the Merrill rifle; and the Merrill, Latrobe, & Thomas Carbine.

Jenks-Merrill carbine
The Jenks-Merrill carbine was an altered firearm by James H Merrill. The carbine was a .54 caliber, single -shot, percussion, breechloader with a 24 1/4 inch round barrel and two barrel bands. Approximately 300 were modified for the U.S. Navy to use the action from the Merrill carbine.

Merrill rifle
The Merrill rifle was produced from 1862–65 with a total quantity estimated at over 800. The rifle was a .54 caliber, single -shot, percussion, breechloader with an action identical to the Merrill Carbine, but with a 33-inch barrel, two barrel bands, and a lug for attaching a bayonet. It also had a brass patch box similar to the First Type carbine. Serial numbers are in the "5000 - 14000" range. Of the rifles produced, 770 were purchased by the Union government during the Civil War. Most were issued to infantry regiments with small quantities issued to sharpshooters.

Merrill, Latrobe, & Thomas carbine
The Merrill, Latrobe, & Thomas carbine was a carbine designed by James Merrill and manufactured by Samuel Remington of E. Remington and Sons in 1855. The carbine was a .58 caliber, single-shot, breechloader with a 21-inch round barrel and a single barrel band. One hundred and seventy were purchased by the U.S. Ordnance Department for trial use.

See also
Rifles in the American Civil War

References

External links
Shooting the rifle

American Civil War rifles
Carbines
Single-shot rifles